Hurnamaira is a village in the tribal belt of Azad Kashmir, Pakistan.  It is located five miles east of the Capital city of Poonch District, Rawalakot. It is considered to be a suburb of Rawalakot.

Geography 
Hurnamaira is approximately 67 kilometers (or 42 miles) from the capital of Pakistan, Islamabad.

References

Populated places in Poonch District, Pakistan